Stigmella glutinosae is a moth of the family Nepticulidae. It is found in all of Europe (except Iceland, Spain and the southern part of the Balkan Peninsula).

The wingspan is .The head is ochreous-yellowish or orange, collar yellow -whitish. Antennal eyecaps yellowwhitish. Forewings bronze-fuscous, sometimes purplish-tinged a narrow whitish fascia beyond middle ; apical area beyond this dark purplish-fuscous. Hindwings light grey. Adults are on wing in May. There are two generations per year.

The larvae feed on Alnus glutinosa, Alnus cordata, Alnus incana, Alnus subcordata and Alnus viridis. They mine the leaves of their host plant. The mine consists of a full depth, slender corridor. There might be several mines in a single leaf. Pupation takes place outside of the mine.

References

External links
Swedish moths
 Stigmella glutinosae images at  Consortium for the Barcode of Life

Nepticulidae
Moths described in 1858
Moths of Europe